Nina Beachcroft (born 1931) is an English writer, who specialises in children's fantasy novels.

Biography
Beachcroft was born in 1931, daughter of the writer Thomas Owen (T.O.) Beachcroft.  She was educated at Wimbledon High School and St Hilda's College, Oxford 1950–53.  In 1954 she married Richard Gardner, with whom she had two daughters.  In the 1950s, she worked as a sub editor for The Argosy and the Radio Times and currently lives in Knebworth, Hertfordshire, England.  Her first novel Well Met By Witchlight was published in the UK in 1972.  She has written nine children's novels.

Literary criticism
Beachcroft's novels are in the children's fantasy genre, including witches, genies and other magic characters interacting with human children.  Neil Philip in the London Times describes her magical plots as having "none of the portentous mysticism of many of the vogue fantasies of the sixties and seventies ... instead she uses magic lightly to explore the theme of control."

Books
Well Met by Witchlight (Heinemann, 1972); Atheneum Books, 1973
Under the Enchanter (Heinemann, 1974)
Cold Christmas: A Ghost Story (Heinemann, 1974)
A Spell of Sleep (Heinemann, 1976)
A Visit to Folly Castle (Heinemann, 1977)
A Farthing for the Fair (Heinemann, 1978)
The Wishing People (Heinemann, 1980)
The Genie and Her Bottle (Heinemann, 1983)
Beyond World's End (Heinemann, 1985)

References

External links

 Nina Beachcroft on Google Books
 
 T. O. Beachcroft (father) at LC Authorities, 11 records, and at WorldCat

1931 births
Living people
20th-century English novelists
English children's writers
English fantasy writers
Alumni of St Hilda's College, Oxford
British women short story writers
Women science fiction and fantasy writers
English women novelists
20th-century English women writers
20th-century British short story writers
People from Knebworth